Reginald Hector Whistler (22 January 1905, in Jersey, Channel Islands–1978), known as Hector, was a painter, muralist and illustrator. He was the cousin of artist Rex Whistler and glass engraver Lawrence Whistler.

His life and creative activity
He was born in Jersey in the family of Herbert Frederick Whistler and Blanche Hasler and educated at Victoria College there, then at the London School of Architecture, and Slade School of Art.

He illustrated When Poland Smiled, by Derek du Pré, in 1940, during World War II, with profits going to the Polish Relief Fund.

He moved to Jamaica in 1948.

His paintings are in the collections of All Souls College, Oxford and Jersey Museum and Art Gallery. Ascension of the Black Christ (1954) is in the First Baptist Church in Toronto, Canada.

Whistler is known for his etched glass panels for the Liverpool Philharmonic Hall. and for his illustrations for an edition of The Prime Minister by Anthony Trollope.
Glass doors panels by Whistler, originally from Liverpool Philharmonic Hall, and depicting musical instruments in art deco style, were featured on the BBC One's Antiques Roadshow and were shown to Paul Atterbury in March 2015. Thirteen Pilkington glass panels had been purchased from a market in France by a Liverpool dealer, who expressed an interest in donating some to local museums.

Books about him
Alissandra Cummin, Hector Whistler. Publisher: Barbados Museum and Historical Society (1988).

His selected works
Sold in auctions 
 The Forum Rome, 1957, watercolour.
 Mellons, Tengiers, 1957, oil on canvas.
 Market, Tangiers, 1957, biro watercolour.
 Grasse, France, 1957, biro watercolour 
 A scene in the Caribbean, figures on a shore, watercolour.
 Rome, 1956, pencil and crayon
 Architectural Studies, 1956. Pencil sketches and colourwash
 View of a ruined temple in Rome, pencil and pastel drawing.

In museums collections 
 Sir Hugh Springer (1950). All Souls College, University of Oxford
 Portrait of a Gentleman in Military Dress (1956). Jersey Museum and Art Gallery

References

External links
 

1905 births
Place of birth missing
1978 deaths
Place of death missing
British muralists
Jersey painters
British illustrators
Date of death missing